WABQ (1460 AM) is a commercial radio station licensed to Painesville, Ohio, currently carrying a gospel music format. Owned by Radio Advantage One, LLC, WABQ serves Lake County and eastern parts of Greater Cleveland, and is a local affiliate for the Cleveland Cavaliers Radio Network. WABQ's studios and transmitter tower are located off of One Radio Place on the northeastern end of Painesville.

History
The station went on the air April 25, 1956 as a daytime only station under the call sign WPVL (Where People Value Listening). Somerset Broadcasting, Inc. was the original owner under President/General Manager & Chief Engineer, Carl R. Lee. The station was originally located 102 S. Park Place in downtown Painesville, just a few steps to the NE from Carlisle-Allen Department store and the Parmly Hotel to the NW. The original staff featured Elwood Thompson, who moved from WVSC, Somerset, Pennsylvania to be WPVL's first Program Director, James Ahlstrom was News and Sports Director and Tom Christen acted as the station's Farm Director. A couple of years later, the Sales Manager was Don Atkin, on-air personalities were, Jim Stephenson, Promotion Manager and on-air talent, Dick Gascoigne, and Bill Starkey, Sports Director.

In 1959, WPVL, Inc. built new studios in a new building at 713 Fobes Street which later was rechristened One Radio Place. The station is still located at this address. Carl R. Lee also was involved in the ownership and building of another AM daytime station, WDLR (1550 AM) in Delaware, Ohio.

It became WQLS on January 15, 1984. WQLS would be purchased by Dale Broadcasting, then the owner of WBKC (1560 AM) in Chardon, in late November 1985 for $750,000; after the purchase, WQLS's calls were changed to WBKC on March 3, 1986.

WBKC later had an adult contemporary format until 2001, when it became a simulcast of classical station WCLV 104.9 FM in Cleveland.  WBKC's simulcast was meant to help overcome some of WCLV's signal problems in the eastern portion of the Cleveland radio market, after that station's move to a weaker signal licensed to Lorain, west of Cleveland. WBKC was the Lake County affiliate for the Cleveland Indians, Cleveland Browns and Ohio State Buckeyes.

The station was sold to Dale Edwards, owner and operator of WABQ in Cleveland, in 2004. With the sale, Edwards operated WBKC under the "Radio Advantage One, LLC" banner, but maintained the simulcast of WCLV programming. In October 2006, Edwards sold off WABQ's 1540  facility over to Good Karma Broadcasting for their purposes of launching a sports talk station, WWGK. In response, WBKC dropped the WCLV simulcast, and switched over to the gospel format that was previously on 1540. The station would also drop coverage of all Cleveland sports teams, choosing to focus all of its schedule (save mornings) on gospel music and religious programs aimed at the East side of Cleveland (where the bulk of the city's African-American population resides).

WBKC swapped call signs with WABQ on October 24, 2006, and the WBKC call letters were then retired on November 7, as AM 1540 took on WWGK as their new calls (reflecting the new ownership).

On July 26, 2011, Cleveland Scene reported that WABQ would flip to a progressive talk format on August 1, 2011. The change came about due to a lease management agreement with veteran radio station executive Gary Richards, who at the time operated like-formatted station WVKO (1580 AM) in Columbus; the actual flip occurred on August 4, 2011. As part of the progressive talk format, WABQ was a local affiliate for The Stephanie Miller Show, The Ed Schultz Show, and The Mike Malloy Radio Show, as well as programs hosted by nationally syndicated personalities Thom Hartmann, Bill Press, Leslie Marshall, along with being an affiliate for NBC News Radio and MarketWatch.

At an unspecified date, the lease agreement of WABQ by Gary Richards ended, and the station reverted to gospel music programming. WABQ remains an affiliate of the Cleveland Cavaliers Radio Network.

References

External links 

 FCC History Cards for WABQ (WPVL)

1956 establishments in Ohio
Gospel radio stations in the United States
Radio stations established in 1956
ABQ
ABQ